Israel Castro Macías (born 20 December 1980) is a Mexican former professional footballer who played as a defensive midfielder.

Club career

Pumas UNAM
He joined the Pumas youth system and worked his way through the ranks to debut in 2002; he was a regular starter and played a very important role in the 2004 campaign of the team, when Pumas won consecutive league championships. Fans also call him the "Asesino de galácticos" or "Galactic Assassin". Since he was the lone scorer in the game when Pumas defeated Real Madrid for the Santiago Bernabeu trophy in 2004. After becoming  champion with Pumas Unam he was drafted by  Cruz Azul. He left the team as a captain.

Honours
UNAM
Mexico Primera División: Clausura 2004, Apertura 2004, Clausura 2009, Clausura 2011
Campeón de Campeones: 2004

Cruz Azul
Copa MX: Clausura 2013

Guadalajara
Copa MX: Apertura 2015

Mexico
CONCACAF Gold Cup: 2009, 2011

Individual
Best Defensive Midfielder of the tournament:Clausura 2011

Career statistics

International

International goals
Scores and results list Mexico's goal tally first.

References

External links
 Israel Castro Profile at FootballDatabase
 
 

1980 births
Living people
Footballers from Mexico City
Association football midfielders
Mexico international footballers
CONCACAF Gold Cup-winning players
2007 Copa América players
2009 CONCACAF Gold Cup players
2010 FIFA World Cup players
2011 CONCACAF Gold Cup players
Club Universidad Nacional footballers
Cruz Azul footballers
C.D. Guadalajara footballers
CD Toledo players
Liga MX players
Segunda División B players
Mexican expatriate footballers
Mexican expatriate sportspeople in Spain
Expatriate footballers in Spain
Mexican footballers